The Blake Falls Reservoir is a reservoir in the Adirondack Park in Parishville, New York.  It is a popular recreational fishing spot, stocked with brown bullhead, northern pike, smallmouth bass, walleye, and yellow perch.

References

External links
 

Reservoirs in New York (state)
Protected areas of St. Lawrence County, New York
Reservoirs in St. Lawrence County, New York